Filip Ugrinic (born 5 January 1999) is a Swiss professional footballer who plays as a midfielder for Swiss Super League club Bern. He will join Young Boys on 1 July 2022. Ugrinic has represented Switzerland internationally at youth level.

Club career

FC Luzern
Born in Lucerne, Switzerland, Ugrinic began playing football for local club FC Kickers Luzern before moving to the Luzern in 2006.

At the start of the 2016–17 season, he made the leap into the FC Luzern first team competing in Swiss Super League, where he made his professional debut on 15 October 2016 in the away game against Basel. On 26 November in the 2–1 away victory against Thun, Ugrinić was in the starting line-up for the first time and played the entire match. He also recorded his first assist in the Super League in this game, directing a free-kick to Tomislav Puljić who made it 1–0. On 3 December 2016, he signed his first professional contract with Luzern until 2020. His youth contract ran until 2017. 

On 13 July 2017, Ugrinic made his European debut in the second qualifying round of the UEFA Europa League, a 2–0 loss to Osijek. He scored his first professional goal on 26 October 2017 in a 3–2 away win in the Swiss Cup, knocking out Echallens.

Ugrinic scored his first league goal on 30 September 2018 in a 3–1 home defeat against Sion.

On 3 July 2019, his contract with Luzern was extended until 2021 and he was sent on a season-long loan to Eredivisie club Emmen. After his return to Luzern, he won the Swiss Cup with the team in May 2021.

BSC Young Boys
On 31 May 2022, Young Boys announced that they had reached an agreement with Luzern for the transfer of Ugrinic. He signed a four-year contract and was set to join the club on 1 July.

International career
Ugrinic is a youth international for Switzerland at the U18 and U19 levels. In October 2019, he was capped at U21 level.

Personal life
Ugrinic is of Serbian descent.

Career statistics

Honours
FC Luzern
 Swiss Cup: 2020–21

References

External links
 

1999 births
Living people
Swiss men's footballers
Swiss expatriate footballers
Switzerland youth international footballers
Swiss people of Serbian descent
Swiss Super League players
Eredivisie players
FC Luzern players
FC Emmen players
BSC Young Boys players
Swiss expatriate sportspeople in the Netherlands
Expatriate footballers in the Netherlands
Association football midfielders
Sportspeople from Lucerne